Lagrange Island is a small rocky island  northeast of Newton Island and  north of Cape Mousse, Adélie Coast, Antarctica. It was charted in 1951 by the French Antarctic Expedition and named after Joseph-Louis Lagrange, the French mathematician.

See also 
 List of Antarctic and sub-Antarctic islands

References

Islands of Adélie Land